Lozno-Oleksandrivka is an urban-type settlement in Svatove Raion (district) in Luhansk Oblast of eastern Ukraine. Population: 

Until 18 July 2020, Lozno-Oleksandrivka was located in Bilokurakyne Raion. The raion was abolished on 18 July 2020 as part of the administrative reform of Ukraine, which reduced the number of raions of Luhansk Oblast to eight, of which only four were controlled by the government. The area of Bilokurakyne Raion was merged into Svatove Raion.

Demographics
Native language distribution as of the Ukrainian Census of 2001:
 Ukrainian: 93.65%
 Russian: 6.27%

References

Urban-type settlements in Svatove Raion
Starobelsky Uyezd